Rubén Palazuelos García (born 11 April 1983) is a Spanish footballer who plays for Gimnástica de Torrelavega as a defensive midfielder.

After only playing lower league football in his country, he spent most of his career in Scotland, mainly with Hearts for which he appeared in 125 official matches. He also competed professionally in Greece, Bulgaria, Finland, England and Cyprus.

Club career
Born in Santander, Palazuelos began his career with hometown club Racing de Santander, but never made it past the reserves. Released in 2004, he spent his first professional seasons in Segunda División B with UD Lanzarote and CF Palencia, before moving to Gimnástica de Torrelavega in 2006 (also in that level).

However, Palazuelos did not represent the Cantabrian neighbours in one single official game, and joined Greek side Aris Thessaloniki F.C. on loan for the 2006–07 campaign. In the following summer, on 31 July, he signed for Heart of Midlothian after a protracted process, as the player reportedly paid for his release from his Gimnástica contract.

Palazuelos made his debut for his new team in the 1–1 draw with Aberdeen at Pittodrie on 12 August 2007, and scored his first goal on 29 December of that year against Falkirk, but in a 1–2 away loss. He added another two in 2008–09, against Motherwell in a 2–1 home win and at Rangers in which he netted the final 2–2 equaliser.

Palazuelos signed for Bulgarian club PFC Botev Plovdiv in July 2012, leaving in the following transfer window. On 5 April 2013, he switched teams and countries again, joining Finland's FC Honka; he made an immediate impact with the latter, being selected to the Team of the Month in the Veikkausliiga for the months of July and August.

On 18 February 2014, after being linked with a move back to Scotland with Partick Thistle, Palazuelos signed with Football League Championship side Yeovil Town until the end of the season. He was hampered by injury during his spell, his team suffered relegation and he was released in May.

On 30 January 2015, following a brief spell in Cyprus, Palazuelos joined Ross County. He was one of 14 players released by the club at the end of the season.

References

External links

London Hearts profile

1983 births
Living people
Spanish footballers
Footballers from Santander, Spain
Association football midfielders
Segunda División B players
Tercera División players
Rayo Cantabria players
CF Palencia footballers
Gimnástica de Torrelavega footballers
Deportivo Alavés players
CD Guijuelo footballers
Real Avilés CF footballers
Super League Greece players
Aris Thessaloniki F.C. players
Scottish Premier League players
Scottish Professional Football League players
Heart of Midlothian F.C. players
Ross County F.C. players
First Professional Football League (Bulgaria) players
Botev Plovdiv players
Veikkausliiga players
FC Honka players
English Football League players
Yeovil Town F.C. players
Cypriot First Division players
Ermis Aradippou FC players
Spanish expatriate footballers
Expatriate footballers in Greece
Expatriate footballers in Scotland
Expatriate footballers in Bulgaria
Expatriate footballers in Finland
Expatriate footballers in England
Expatriate footballers in Cyprus
Spanish expatriate sportspeople in Greece
Spanish expatriate sportspeople in Scotland
Spanish expatriate sportspeople in Bulgaria
Spanish expatriate sportspeople in Finland
Spanish expatriate sportspeople in England
Spanish expatriate sportspeople in Cyprus